Zorita is a Dutch band that was formed in 2009. Their music might be best classified as folk with influences of pop and world music.

The group released its debut album Amor Y Muerte in May 2012. The band made appearances at Lowlands, Oerol and Zwarte Cross. In June 2013 they performed at the Dutch TV programme Vrije Geluiden. A tour through Great Britain in August 2014, where they played at Boomtown, was captured in the music documentary Until We Die. The documentary was released in April 2015, together with the EP Until We Die.

Band members 
 Carlos Zorita Diaz – vocals, guitar, tres, charango
 Jarno van Es – keys, accordion
 Joost Abbel – guitar, banjo, pedal steel guitar
 Robert Koomen – bass, vocals
 René van Haren – trombone
 Thomas Geerts – trumpet, flugelhorn
 Abel de Vries – drums, percussion

Discography 
 Aphrodite (2017)
 Until We Die (2015)
 Amor Y Muerte (2012)

External links 
 Official Website

References 

Musical groups from North Holland
Dutch pop music groups
Musical groups from Amsterdam
Musical groups established in 2009